Tullia Zevi (née Calabi) (2 February 1919 – 22 January 2011) was an Italian journalist and writer.  Zevi's family fled Italy to France and then to the US after the rise of fascism in the 1930s. While in New York City, she married Bruno Zevi.  She returned to Europe in 1946, and was one of the few women journalists to report the Nuremberg Trials. On her return to Italy, she played a major role in Interfaith dialog, and was active in Italian Centre-left politics.  Zevi was president of the Union of Italian Jewish Communities from 1983 to 1998.

Biography
Zevi was born in Milan, one of four children of a middle-class Jewish-Italian family.

Her father Giuseppe Calabi was a lawyer and prominent anti-fascist. Her brother is the mathematician Eugenio Calabi.

Zevi studied philosophy at the University of Milan and studied music the Milan Conservatory. When the Fascist government of Italy passed Anti-Jewish laws, Zevi was on holiday in Switzerland with her family.
Later they moved to France, where Zevi continued her studies at Sorbonne in Paris. Anticipating the Fall of France, the Calabi family emigrated to the United States, where she joined the antifascist Mazzini Society and considered Gaetano Salvemini her teacher.
In New York she met architect Bruno Zevi. The couple married in 1940.

As a journalist, Zevi reported the Nuremberg Trials. Zevi returned to Italy in 1946.

Zevi was an Italian correspondent for London-based newspaper The Jewish Chronicle from 1948 to 1963 and Israeli newspaper Maariv from 1960 to 1993.

Awards
Zevi was awarded the Knighthood of the Great Cross in 1993 .

References

1919 births
2011 deaths
Journalists from Milan
20th-century Italian Jews
Presidents of the Union of Italian Jewish Communities
Italian women writers
Italian writers
Italian women journalists
University of Milan alumni
20th-century Italian women
Italian expatriates in France
Italian expatriates in the United States
Jewish Italian writers